Eirenis rothii, known commonly as Roth's dwarf racer, is a species of snake in the family Colubridae. The species is endemic to the Middle East.

Etymology
The specific name, rothii, is in honor of German naturalist Johannes Rudolph Roth (1814–1858).

Geographic range
E. rothii is found in Israel, Jordan, Lebanon, Syria, and Turkey. It may also occur in Iraq.

Habitat

Description
The top of the head and neck are black, with three or four transverse yellow lines. The black on the neck descends to include the sides of the throat. The body is brownish yellow dorsally, and white ventrally. The dorsal scales are in 15 rows at midbody.

Reproduction
E. rothii is oviparous.

References

Further reading
Jan G (1863). "Enumerazione sistematica degli ofidi appartenenti al gruppo Coronellidae ". Archivio per la Zoologia l'Anatomia e la Fisiologia 2: 213–330. (Eirenis rothii, new species, pp. 256–257). (in Italian).
Jan [G] (1866). Iconographie générale des Ophidiens, Quinzième livraison [Issue 15]. [Illustrated by Ferdinando Sordelli ]. Paris: J.-B. Baillière et Fils. Index + Plates I-VI. (Eirenis rothii, Plate V, figure 1). (in French).
Wallach V, Williams KL, Boundy J (2014). Snakes of the World: A Catalogue of Living and Extinct Species. Boca Raton, Florida: CRC Press, Taylor & Francis Group. 1,237 pp. .

Eirenis
Reptiles described in 1863
Reptiles of the Middle East
Snakes of Jordan